Bastiaan Van Den Eynde (born 22 February 2000) is a Belgian basketball player for Basics Melsele of the Belgian Second Division. His cousin Niels Van den Eynde and brother Mathijs Van den Eynde are also a professional basketball players.

Professional career
He was born in Ninove. Van den Eynde played in the youth ranks of United Ninove and Okapi Aalst before joining third division BC Guco Lier in 2015. In 2017 he joined the Antwerp Giants where he made his debut in the first division in 2018. After winning the Belgian Cup twice, he signed a contract with Okapi Aalst. In January 2022, he signed with Basics Melsele.

Honours
Antwerp
Belgian Cup: 2019, 2020

References

2000 births
Living people
Antwerp Giants players
Belgian men's basketball players
Shooting guards